The 1900 South Australian Football Association season was the 24th season of the top-level Australian rules football competition in South Australia.

The  Football Club won their first premiership and  collected their third wooden spoon, which is the club's last as of 2021.

Minor rounds 
The minor rounds comprised twelve matches.  finished as the minor premiers, one win ahead of West Torrens.

Major rounds 
The major premiership was contested under the same system which had been adopted by the Victorian Football League in 1898 (except adapted for six teams instead of eight). The six teams were broken into two sections: section A comprised North Adelaide (1st), South Adelaide (3rd) and West Adelaide (5th); section B comprised West Torrens (2nd), Norwood (4th) and Port Adelaide (6th). Each section played an individual round-robin; then, the section winners played off in a final. The minor premiers, North Adelaide, would then have the right to challenge the winner of the final to a Grand Final for the major premiership.

Sectional matches

Finals

References 

SAFA
South Australian National Football League seasons